Sagesse Sports Club, known as Hekmeh in Arabic, is a multi-sports club in Lebanon.

History
Hekmeh, or Club Sportif La Sagesse was founded in 1943, under the patronage of the Maronite father Boulos Kike, supported by his excellency Mgr. Jean Maroun, with mainly the football program.

A sports club that represents Collège de la Sagesse founded in 1875 in Achrafieh, a prominent quarter in Beirut, Lebanon.

Al-Hikma in classical Arabic, El-Hekmeh in Lebanese dialect stands for "wisdom", thus also the French alternative name of the club, Sagesse (meaning wisdom in French). Green and white are the colours of the club and the club is popularly known as the Greens.

Since its foundation the football club was very popular in Beirut and shined during the golden era of Lebanese football, the club represented Lebanese football worldwide by playing friendlies against notable clubs from around the world.

The club is also very well known for its basketball programme as Hekmeh BC. The basketball club of Hekmeh was founded in 1992, and soon became one of the  most successful Lebanese basketball clubs ever with 8 Lebanese Basketball League Championships, 7 Lebanese Basketball Cups, 2 Arab Club Championships, and a record 3 FIBA Asia Champions Cup titles.

Hekmeh SC has many other organized individual and collective sports as well under its banner.

Basketball club

Football club

References 

 
Sport in Lebanon